Bennett Henderson Young (May 25, 1843 – February 23, 1919) was a Confederate officer who led forces in the St Albans raid (October 19, 1864), a military action during the American Civil War. As a lieutenant of the Confederate States Army, he entered Vermont from Canada and occupied the town of St. Albans.

Early life

Young was born in Nicholasville, Kentucky, on May 25, 1843, to Robert Young and Josephine Henderson. He was 17 years old when he enlisted as a private in the Confederate 8th Kentucky Cavalry, a unit that became a part of General John Hunt Morgan's cavalry command.

St. Albans raid
Young had been captured in John Hunt Morgan's 1863 raid in Ohio, but escaped to Canada in the fall of that year. Young went to the south via Nova Scotia and Bermuda, where he proposed Canada-based raids on the Union as a means of building the Confederate treasury and forcing the Union army to protect their northern border as a diversion. Young was commissioned as a lieutenant and returned to Canada, where he recruited other escaped rebels to participate in the October 19, 1864, raid on St. Albans, Vermont, a quiet town 15 miles (25 km) from the Canada–US border.

Young and two others checked into a local hotel on October 10, saying that they had come from St. John's in Canada for a "sporting vacation." Every day, two or three more young men arrived. By October 19, there were 21 cavalrymen assembled; just before 3:00 p.m. the group simultaneously staged an armed robbery of the three banks in St. Albans. They announced that they were Confederate soldiers and stole a total of $208,000 ($ in current dollar terms). As the banks were being robbed, eight or nine of the Confederates held the townspeople prisoner on the village green as their horses were stolen. One townsperson was killed and another wounded. Young ordered his troops to burn the town down, but the four-ounce bottles of Greek fire they had brought failed to work, and only one shed was destroyed.

The raiders fled with the money into Canada, where they were arrested by authorities and held in Montreal. There, the Lincoln administration retained prominent Irish-Canadian lawyer Bernard Devlin, QC, as counsel for the prosecution in the subsequent court case, which sought the raiders' extradition. The court ultimately decided that the soldiers were under military orders and that the officially neutral Canada could not extradite them to America. They were freed, but the $88,000 ($ in current dollar terms) the raiders had on them was returned to Vermont.

Later career
After the end of the Civil War, Young was excluded from President Andrew Johnson's amnesty proclamation. He could not return home until 1868. Thus, he spent time studying law and literature in Ireland at the Queen's University of Ireland and at the University of Edinburgh. 

After being permitted to return to the United States, he became a prominent attorney in Louisville, Kentucky. His philanthropic works were legion.  Young founded the first orphanage for blacks in Louisville, a school for the blind, and did much pro bono work for the poor. He also worked as a railroad officer as President of the Louisville Southern Railroad, author. Young also served on the board of trustees of the Confederate Veteran.

In 1876 Young was selected by Governor McCreary to represent Kentucky at the Paris Exposition.

In 1878, Young joined the Polytechnic Society of Kentucky, as a financier to the institution. Young became president of the society after the death of Dr. Stewart Robinson.

In 1899, Young represented former slave George Dinning in a case against the Ku Klux Klan. 

Between 1890 to 1908, Young helped create the Louisville Free Public Library.

In 1913, Young was elected as Commander-in-Chief of the United Confederate Veterans, which he held until his retirement in 1916 where he was made "honorary commander-in-chief for life."

Family life 
In 1866, Young married Mattie R. Robinson and they had a son named Lawrence, who became an attorney in Chicago. He remarried in 1895 to Eliza S. Sharp and they had a daughter, Eliza Bennett Young, by this union.

List of works 

 The Prehistoric Men of Kentucky
 The History of the Kentucky Constitution
 Evangelistic Work in Kentucky
 Battle of Blue Licks
 The History of Jessamine County
 The History of the Division of the Presbyterian Church in Kentucky
 The Battle of the Thames
 Dr. Gander of Youngland
 Kentucky Eloquence

Death and legacy
By 1908, Young was known as "the father of the Louisville Free Public Library."

Young died on February 23, 1919, at his home at 429 West Ormsby Avenue in Louisville, Kentucky. He was buried at Cave Hill Cemetery in Louisville.

The railroad bridge over the Kentucky River at Tyrone, Kentucky was named Young's High Bridge for him and Youngstown, Kentucky was also named for him.

See also

References

External links

Bennett H. Young
The St. Albans raid
St. Albans Raid: Spies, Raiders and Partisans

1843 births
1919 deaths
People from Nicholasville, Kentucky
Businesspeople from Louisville, Kentucky
Confederate States Army officers
St. Albans, Vermont
Burials at Cave Hill Cemetery
People of Kentucky in the American Civil War
Alumni of the University of Edinburgh
Writers from Louisville, Kentucky
Kentucky lawyers
19th-century American businesspeople
19th-century American lawyers